AF Andromedae (AF And) is a luminous blue variable (LBV), a type of variable star. The star is one of the most luminous variables in M31, the Andromeda Galaxy.

Discovery
The star was discovered to be variable in 1927, with a photographic magnitude range of 15.3 to 16.5, at the Harvard College Observatory and designated HV 4013.  It was considered to be the brightest variable star in M31 Two years later it was given the variable star designation AF Andromedae.  Between 1917 and 1953, five or six major eruptions were detected and two or three minor ones.  More eruptions were observed in 1970-74, 1987-92, 1998-2001,  and 2017.

AF And was often referred to as var 19, after its number in a Hubble list of variable stars in M31 and M33.  It was identified as one of the five Hubble–Sandage variables: Var A, Var B, Var C, and Var 2 in M33, and Var 19 in M31. On the basis of color–color comparisons, it was assigned as spectral type B and described as related to the P Cygni variables. Observations from 1960 to 1970 showed irregular variations in the B (blue) magnitude between 15.5 and 17.6, with visual magnitudes somewhat brighter. The first detailed spectrum was published in 1975.

Spectrum
AF And in outbursts has a peculiar emission line spectrum described as very much like Eta Carinae, likely due to a dense stellar wind.  When quiescent, the spectrum is similar to late Of or WN stars.

AF And has prominent allowed and forbidden FeII and hydrogen lines in its emission spectrum, as well as weaker HeI lines. The variability and lack of absorption lines defy a normal spectral classification, but it was suggested that it may be close to class A.

The 250.7 nm FeII line is unusually strong in emission. The same feature in Eta Carinae's spectrum has been attributed to a UV laser.

Properties
AF And was the brightest star in M31 when it was first noticed during an outburst, at an apparent magnitude around 15, over a million times more luminous than the Sun.  Newer calculations give a luminosity slightly less than a million times that of the Sun.

The star's mass has not been calculated explicitly, but this type of star is massive, typically .

See also

 List of Andromeda's satellite galaxies
 M31-RV

References

Andromeda (constellation)
Andromeda Galaxy
Extragalactic stars
Luminous blue variables
Andromedae, AF
?
Stars in the Andromeda Galaxy